Sergeant Leonard Herbert Emsden   was an observer and gunner aboard Royal Aircraft Factory FE.2b two-seater airplanes. He began scoring aerial victories during March 1917, continued winning through Bloody April, and capped his career as a flying ace with three victories on 1 May 1917. He was credited with a total of eight confirmed aerial triumphs.

Early life
His birthplace is known to be Bosmere, Suffolk, England. His parents were Laura Gant and John Arthur Emsden, who were married in Elmsett, Suffolk, England in 1888. Leonard was the middle child of five in this family, having two elder sisters and two younger brothers. They were orphaned when their father died on 7 February 1898. Laura Emsden would remarry within a year, and supply another daughter to the brood.

World War I
Emsden volunteered to join the military in 1914 during World War I to serve his country, and was sent to France in 1915. As a sergeant with the Bedfordshire Regiment, and after 79 commissioned officers were killed in one day, he personally led three bayonet charges up Hill 60 at the Second Battle of Ypres, taking his objective at the third attempt. He also served with distinction at the battles of the Somme, Cambrai, and St. Quentin. Having survived those battles, he volunteered for the Royal Flying Corps.

He ended up in the Royal Flying Corps as an aircraft mechanic in No. 25 Squadron. He became a gunner on the unit's Royal Aircraft Factory FE.2b pusher aircraft. As the gunner's duties were described:

"When you stood up to shoot, all of you from the knees up was exposed to the elements. There was no (safety) belt to hold you. Only your grip on the gun and the sides of the nacelle stood between you and eternity. Toward the front of the nacelle was a hollow steel rod with a swivel mount to which the gun was anchored. This gun covered a huge field of fire forward.... You had nothing to worry about except being blown out of the aircraft by the blast of air or tossed out bodily if the pilot made a wrong move. There were no parachutes..."

From March through May 1917, Emsden was an Air Mechanic 2nd Class assigned to observer/gunner's duty. He was already an ace on 1 May, when he scored two victories on a morning sortie and a third one in the afternoon. He was wounded in action in the hand. His valorous feats would earn him the Distinguished Conduct Medal, which was gazetted on 18 June 1917:

65935 2nd Class Air Mech. L. H. Emsden, R.F.C.
For conspicuous gallantry and devotion to duty. He has displayed the utmost gallantry and skill as an observer in aerial combats, continually bringing down his opponents with great skill and daring.

Emsden would subsequently be promoted to corporal, then to sergeant before returning home.

List of aerial victories

References
Notes

Bibliography
 
 
 

1976 deaths
1893 births
People from Mid Suffolk District
Bedfordshire and Hertfordshire Regiment soldiers
Royal Flying Corps soldiers
British World War I flying aces
Recipients of the Distinguished Conduct Medal
Military personnel from Suffolk